Goretti Donaire Patón (born 17 August 1982), often known as Goretti, is a Spanish former footballer who played as a midfielder or forward. Throughout her career she played in Spain's Superliga Femenina for Espanyol, Barcelona, Levante and L'Estartit, winning one league title with Levante.

Career
Goretti's career started with Barcelona in the 1999–2000 season. Later in her career, with Levante, Goretti won the 2006–07 Superliga title. In September 2011, it was announced that Goretti had left L'Estartit and retired from football. For L'Estartit, Goretti scored 14 goals in 44 appearances.

Personal life
In an interview with Marca in 2010, Goretti announced that she was working on examinations to join Mossos d'Esquadra, the Catalan police force. In the same interview, she explained that this was because top-level Spanish female footballers struggle to earn enough money to live on playing football alone. In 2017, she was one of 52 current and former Barcelona players inducted into the Barça Players Association, aimed at recognising the most significant female footballers in Barcelona's history.

References

1982 births
Living people
Spanish women's footballers
Primera División (women) players
FC Barcelona Femení players
RCD Espanyol Femenino players
UE L'Estartit players
Levante UD Femenino players
Women's association football forwards
Footballers from Barcelona
Sportswomen from Catalonia